Forest Hill College is a co-educational state secondary college in Burwood East, Victoria, Australia.

The College
Up until 2010, Forest Hill College was divided into 2 sub-schools, Junior (Year 7-9), and Senior (Year 10-12), with a courtyard for Year 7–9, a courtyard for Year 10, and another courtyard for VCE Year 11–12.

New developmental plans for the school were implemented in 2010 which has since changed the way in which the college is divided. No longer are there separate courtyards based on year level, instead students are free to roam the entire college and interact with peers of all ages. This is part of the college's focus on community, in an attempt to build friendships throughout the college, making students feel welcome. This change is only one aspect of the ongoing development within the College.
 
Year levels are assisted in their welfare roles by Junior and Senior Student Wellbeing Coordinators, a part-time Adolescent Health Nurse, a College Chaplain and Home Group Teachers.

Subjects on Offer in VCE
In addition to a standard list of subjects on offer, the school also offers the VCAL (Victorian Certificate of Applied Learning), with students spending a few days at Forest Hill College, other days at TAFEs in the area and for some, a few days at work.

Specialist Programs

 Deaf Facility
 International Student Program
 STEAM (Science, Technology, Engineering, and/arts Mathematics)

Sports Academies:

 Australian Football
 Basketball
 Netball
 Soccer
 Tennis
 Performing Arts

External links
Forest Hill College

Secondary schools in Melbourne
Educational institutions established in 1990
1990 establishments in Australia
Buildings and structures in the City of Whitehorse